Volvarina jimcordyi is a species of sea snail, a marine gastropod mollusk in the family Marginellidae, the margin snails.

Description
Shell is very small, usually under 10mm in length, with dark amber-brown coloring. Shell is translucent. Adult shells have a thickened outer lip margin.  Aperture is wider at the base (anterior-end) & spire is low.

Distribution
Central Eleuthera Island, Bahamas.

References

Marginellidae
Gastropods described in 2007